The 2018 WNBA draft was the league's draft for the 2018 WNBA season. On March 12, the league announced the draft would be held on April 12 at Nike New York Headquarters, a recently opened secondary headquarters for the athletic apparel giant located in Midtown Manhattan.

Draft Lottery
The lottery selection to determine the order of the top four picks in the 2018 Draft was set to take place on September 14, 2017, but was delayed by the league to November 13.

Lottery Chances
All odds out of 1,000 based on percentages. (The 11-12-13-14 combination is ignored.)
Las Vegas Aces (44.2%) - WON
Indiana Fever (27.6%)
Chicago Sky (via Atlanta Dream) (17.8%)
Chicago Sky (10.4%)

The lottery odds were based on combined records from the 2016 and 2017 WNBA seasons. The San Antonio Stars, with the worst two-year record, were guaranteed no worse than the third pick. With the Stars relocating to Las Vegas, Las Vegas retains the best odds.

This is the fifth time that the lottery was won by the team that had the highest odds and second consecutive #1 Pick for Vegas - with the other being used on Kelsey Plum last year when the team was still in San Antonio.

Draft Invitees
On April 6, 2018, the WNBA released the names of the players who would be invited to be in attendance at the draft.
Monique Billings, UCLA
Lexie Brown, Duke
Jordin Canada, UCLA
Diamond DeShields, Çukurova (Turkey)
Kelsey Mitchell, Ohio State
Kia Nurse, UConn
Azurá Stevens, UConn
Victoria Vivians, Mississippi State
Gabby Williams, UConn
A'ja Wilson, South Carolina

Key

Draft selections

Round 1

Round 2

Round 3

Draft Trades
The Las Vegas Aces traded the rights to Jill Barta and their 2019 2nd round pick to the Minnesota Lynx in exchange for the rights to Park Ji-su and the rights to Kahlia Lawrence.

Notable Prospects
On November 7, 2017, WNBA.com posted notable prospects for the draft. The list included:
A'ja Wilson - South Carolina
Kelsey Mitchell - Ohio State
Gabby Williams - Connecticut
Kia Nurse - Connecticut
Jordin Canada - UCLA
Victoria Vivians - Mississippi State
Myisha Hines-Allen - Louisville
Katelynn Flaherty - Michigan

Viewership
The draft was telecast on ESPN2 (1st round) and ESPNU (2nd and 3rd rounds).  The draft had an average audience of 212,000, which is an increase of 25% compared to the 2017 WNBA Draft.  The first round experienced an increase of 13% compared to 2017, with an average audience of 308,000.  The 2nd and 3rd rounds saw a 49% increase in average viewers compared to 2017 (110,000 vs. 74,000).  The 2018 draft was the most watched draft since 2014.

Footnotes

References

Women's National Basketball Association Draft
Draft
WNBA draft
WNBA draft